Lyperanthus serratus, commonly called rattle beaks, is a species of orchid which is endemic to the south-west of Western Australia. It derives its common name from the fact that the flowers rattle if gently shaken.

Description
The flowers have white (non-secreting) glandular hairs on the labellum. A powdery bloom covers the entire plant, except for the innermost parts of the flower.

Taxonomy and naming
The species was first described by John Lindley in 1840 in his The Genera and Species of Orchidaceous Plants. The type specimen was collected by Drummond near the Swan River. Lindley noted "This has, when dried, so much the appearance of L. suaveolens, that I mistook it for that species. It is however a much stouter plant; and, as will be seen by the above character, the labellum is altogether different."
The specific epithet (serratus) refers to the white calli found on the labellum appearing like serrations on its edge.

Distribution and habitat
The species occurs in the Avon Wheatbelt, Esperance Plains, Jarrah Forest, Swan Coastal Plain and Warren biogeographical regions of Western Australia on sand, loam or sandy clay. It grows in a variety of habitats including forest, woodland and heath and often grows through reasonably low, dense vegetation.

Use in horticulture
As with other Australian terrestrial orchids, Lyperanthus serratus is not well known in cultivation but success has been achieved with the closely related Lyperanthus suaveolens.

References

External links 
 

serratus
Endemic orchids of Australia
Orchids of Western Australia
Endemic flora of Western Australia
Taxa named by John Lindley
Plants described in 1840